The Northern Indiana Conference (NIC) is a high school athletic conference that was founded in 1927 and spanned from as far west as Hammond and Gary to South Bend/Mishawaka and Elkhart to the east and south to Plymouth.  Since its start in 1927, a total of 32 separate schools have at one time called the NIC home. From its inception until 1963, the conference had been divided into East and West divisions. The West Division (as well as Valparaiso) left to form the Northwestern Conference in 1963. With membership dwindling to 7 members by the 1970s, the conference added former members of the Northern Indiana Valley Conference to its ranks. Currently, every former NIVC member is now a part of the NIC except for South Bend Jackson, which closed in 1973, and South Bend LaSalle, which joined the NIC in 1977, but closed in 2001.

History
Like the Southern Indiana Athletic Conference, the NIAC was also a superconference that spanned several counties, and a lot of driving miles, for a period between 1940 and 1965. Throughout the 1970s the membership dwindled as many schools left to form new conferences. From 1995 to 2015 the two conferences share the same setup with 7 or 8 schools in one county, 8 in this case from St. Joseph County and 1 from an adjacent county, Elkhart in this case. This will change in 2015, as four schools from the folding Northern State Conference will join, making a 13 school conference. This will also expand the conference footprint into two counties formerly represented in the NIAC: LaPorte (last represented in 1995) and Marshall (last represented in 1930). 2020 will bring more change, as Elkhart Central merges with former member Elkhart Memorial to form Elkhart high school, and Mishawaka leaves for the Northern Lakes Conference, taking Memorial's spot in that league.

Sponsored Sports

Boys
Baseball, Basketball, Cross Country, Football, Golf, Soccer, Swimming & Diving, Tennis, Track & Field, Wrestling

Girls
Basketball, Cross Country, Golf, Gymnastics, Soccer, Softball, Swimming & Diving, Tennis, Track & Field, Volleyball

Current members

 Elkhart was known as Elkhart Central between 1972-2020. In 2020, Elkhart Central consolidated with Elkhart Memorial. 
 Played concurrently in NIC and NIVC 1974-78.
 South Bend St. Joseph was known as South Bend St. Joseph's until 2012.

Former members

 East Chicago Washington was known as East Chicago until 1928.
 Michigan City Elston was known as Michigan City until 1972.
 South Bend Central was known as South Bend until 1930.
 Played concurrently in the NIC and FWCS their entire membership in the NIC.
 Played concurrently in the NIC and NLC 1999-2000.
 Played concurrently in the NIC and NIVC 1976-78.

Membership timeline

Rivalries

Main rivalries: 
Riley Wildcats vs. Penn Kingsmen
Clay Colonials vs. Washington Panthers
Penn Kingsmen vs. Mishawaka Cavemen* (often called "The Backyard Brawl")
St. Joseph Indians vs. Marian Knights (often called "The Holy War")
Riley Wildcats vs. Adams Eagles
New Prairie Cougars vs. La Porte* Slicers
Bremen Lions vs. Jimtown Jimmies (Rivalry published in November 1994 issue of Sports Illustrated magazine "Unrivaled Rivalries")

Notable sub-rivalries
Riley vs. Clay
Adams vs. Clay
St. Joseph vs. Penn
Riley vs. Marian (often called "The South Side Brawl")
Jimtown vs. NorthWood* (often called "The Border War")
Bremen vs. Triton* (also often called "The Border War")
Penn vs. Fort Wayne Snider*
Marian vs. Mishawaka* (often called "The Civil War")
St. Joseph vs. Clay
Mishawaka* vs. Washington
Marian vs. Penn (baseball only)
St. Joseph vs. Culver Military Academy (hockey and lacrosse only)*°
Mishawaka vs. Clay (football only)
Mishawaka vs. Adams (basketball only)

Former rivalries
Elkhart Central Blue Blazers vs. Elkhart Memorial Crimson Chargers* (often called "The Battle of Elkhart")
Lasalle vs Washington.

(Asterisk indicates non-member of NIC)

(Degree indicates a non-NIC sanctioned sport)

State Championships

Bremen (3)
 1989 Football (A)
 1994 Football (2A)
 2019 Softball (2A)

Elkhart Central (6)
 1968 Wrestling
 1969 Boys Track
 1973 Boys Cross Country
 1979 Boys Golf
 1993 Boys Track
 2012 Baseball (4A)

Jimtown (6)
 1974 Boys Gymnastics
 1991 Football (A)
 1997 Football (2A)
 1998 Football (2A)
 2004 Boys Basketball (2A)
 2005 Football (2A)

Glenn (0)

Mishawaka (7)

 1946 Boys Cross Country
 1980 Volleyball
 1983 Volleyball
 1988 Volleyball
 1991 Wrestling
 2008 Wrestling
 2010 Wrestling

Mishawaka Marian (11)

 1973 Volleyball
 1973 Football (A)
 1975 Football (2A)
 1976 Football (2A)
 2001 Boys Golf
 1999 Boys Hockey
 2001 Boys Hockey
 2010 Boys Hockey
 2012 Girls Soccer (A)
 2015 Boys Soccer (A)
 2016 Boys Soccer (A)

New Prairie (0)

Penn (22)

 1983 Football (4A)
 1994 Baseball
 1994 Girls Golf
 1995 Football (5A)
 1996 Football (5A)
 1997 Football (5A)
 1998 Baseball (4A)
 1999 Softball (3A)
 1999 Boys Soccer
 2000 Football (5A)
 2001 Baseball (4A)
 2002 Girls Golf
 2004 Girls Golf
 2005 Girls Golf
 2010 Volleyball (4A)
 2011 Volleyball (4A)
 2015 Wrestling
 2015 Baseball (4A)
 2016 Girls Basketball (4A)
 2016 Girls Soccer (2A)
 2017 Girls Soccer (3A)
 2022 Baseball (4A)

South Bend Adams (8)

 1966 Boys Swimming & Diving
 1966 Wrestling
 1967 Boys Swimming & Diving
 1968 Boys Swimming & Diving
 1973 Boys Golf
 1974 Boys Tennis
 1976 Volleyball
 1978 Volleyball

South Bend Clay (2)

 1970 Baseball
 1994 Boys Basketball

South Bend Riley (10)

 1938 Boys Golf
 1956 Boys Swimming & Diving
 1957 Boys Swimming & Diving
 1958 Boys Swimming & Diving
 1962 Boys Swimming & Diving
 1962 Boys Golf
 1964 Boys Golf
 1978 Boys Swimming & Diving
 1986 Boys Swimming & Diving
 1995 Boys Swimming & Diving

South Bend St. Joseph (10)

 1972 Volleyball
 1975 Girls Tennis
 1995 Football (3A)
 1998 Girls Soccer
 2003 Boys Soccer
 2005 Girls Basketball (3A)
 2010 Girls Tennis
 2010 Girls Soccer
 2017 Girls Basketball (3A)
 2017 Baseball (3A)

South Bend Washington (3)

 1973 Football (3A)
 2007 Girls Basketball (4A)
 2022 Girls Basketball (3A)

See also
 Hoosier Hysteria
 Largest high school gyms in the United States

Related links
 Northern Indiana Football History
 Indiana High School Athletic Association
 List of high school athletic conferences in Indiana
 Indiana big school football champions

References

Conference Champions
 Basketball Champions
 Football Champions

Indiana high school athletic conferences